P.A.O.K. FC (Πανθεσσαλονίκειος Αθλητικός Όμιλος Κωνσταντινουπολιτών,  Panthessaloníkios Athlitikós Ómilos Konstadinoupolitón, "Pan-Thessalonian Athletic Club of Constantinopolitans"), commonly known as PAOK Thessaloniki or simply PAOK, is a Greek professional football club based in Thessaloniki, Macedonia. PAOK are one of the top domestic clubs, the most widely supported in Northern Greece and with the 3rd largest fanbase in the country, according to the latest polls and researches. A research by Marca in August 2018, reported that PAOK are the most popular Greek football team on social media.

Established on 20 April 1926 by Greek refugees who fled to Thessaloniki from Constantinople in the wake of the Greco-Turkish War (1919–1922), they play their home games at Toumba Stadium, a 29,000 seating capacity football ground. Their name, along with the club's emblem, the Byzantine-style double-headed eagle with retracted wings, honours the memory of the people and places (mostly from the city of Constantinople) that once belonged to the Byzantine Empire.

PAOK currently plays in the top-flight Super League, which they have won three times (in 1976, 1985 and 2019). They are eight-time winners of the Greek Cup (in 1972, 1974, 2001, 2003, 2017, 2018, 2019 and 2021). The club is one of the three which have never been relegated from the top national division and the only team in Greece that have won the Double (in 2019) going unbeaten (26–4–0 record) in a national round-robin league tournament (league format since 1959).

The team has appeared several times in the UEFA Europa League, but has yet to reach the group stage of the UEFA Champions League. PAOK have reached twice the quarter-finals of a European competition, in the 1973–74 European Cup Winners' Cup and in the inaugural 2021–22 UEFA Europa Conference League. PAOK is the only Greek team that has more wins than losses in their European record (80 wins, 62 draws and 76 defeats, as of 28 July 2022) and the 0–7 away UEFA Cup win over Locomotive Tbilisi on 16 September 1999 is the largest ever achieved by a Greek football club in all European competitions.

History

Foundation and early years (1926–1945) 

PAOK FC is the oldest department of the major multi-sport club AC P.A.O.K., which is closely linked with Hermes Sports Club, that was formed in 1875 by the Greek community of Pera, a district of Istanbul (Constantinople).

The football club was founded in April 1926 by Constantinopolitan who fled to Thessaloniki after the Greek defeat in the Greco-Turkish War. PAOK's policy was to be open to every citizen of Thessaloniki, leading to a minor rivalry with AEK Thessaloniki, the other Constantinopolitan club of the city, in which only refugees were allowed to play. The original logo of PAOK was a horseshoe and a four-leaf clover.

PAOK played their primary friendly match on 4 May 1926 at the stadium of Thermaikos, defeating Megas Alexandros Thessaloniki 2–1. The first coach of the club was Kostas Andreadis who spent five years on the team's bench without demanding payment. Their first captain was Michalis Ventourelis.

In 1926–1927 season, PAOK participated in the 2nd tier of Macedonia Football Clubs Association ( or Ε.Π.Σ.Μ.) local championship. PAOK FC historic inaugural official match was a 3–1 win against Nea Genea Kalamaria on 12 December 1926. Despite finishing at the top of the 2nd division, PAOK were forced by the organizing committee to play against the 1st division teams and defeat all of them in order to get promoted. Eventually, they defeated all four teams: Thermaikos 4–1, Aris 2–1, Atlas Ippodromiou 2–0 (w/o) and Iraklis 1–0. In 1927–1928, PAOK participated for the first time in the 1st tier of Ε.Π.Σ.Μ.

The first professional contract was signed by the club on 5 September 1928. The contract stipulated that the French footballer Raymond Etienne (of Jewish descent from Pera Club) would be paid 4,000 drachmas per month. The contract was signed by Dr. Meletiou, the PAOK chairman, and Mr. Sakellaropoulos, the Hon. Secretary.

In March 1929, AEK Thessaloniki was disbanded as a sports club and their members joined PAOK. PAOK thereupon changed their emblem, adopting the Double-headed eagle, as a symbol of the club's Byzantine/Constantinopolitan heritage. PAOK also got possession of AEK's facilities located around Syntrivani (i.e. Fountain) Square, next to the Children's Heritage Foundation, where today stands the Faculty of Theology of the Aristotle University of Thessaloniki.

In 1930–1931, PAOK made their debut in the Panhellenic Championship, playing their first match on 1 February 1931 against Olympiacos at Piraeus, where they were defeated by 3–1, and ended the season in 5th place. The first foreign coach in team's history was Austrian Rudolf Gasner, who served at PAOK in 1931–1932. On 5 June 1932 the Syntrivani Stadium was inaugurated with PAOK's 3–2 victory over Iraklis. Syntrivani meant to be their home ground for 27 years.

In 1937, PAOK won their first title, the Macedonia championship and participated in the Panhellenic Championship, finishing 2nd. The 1937 team included: Sotiriadis, Vatikis, Goulios, Kontopoulos, Bostantzoglou, Panidis, Glaros, Kritas, Ioannidis, Kalogiannis, Koukoulas, Kosmidis, Apostolou, Vafiadis, Vasiliadis, Anastasiadis, Moschidis, Tzakatzoglou, Zakapidas.

On 28 May 1939, PAOK competed for first time in a Greek Cup final against AEK Athens and were defeated 2–1 at Apostolos Nikolaidis Stadium. The following season, PAOK won the Northern Greece Championship and reached the two-legged final of the Panhellenic Championship, but they lost 5–3 on aggregate to AEK.

The declaration of the Greco-Italian War caused mobilization in Greece and ended every sport activity. PAOK football players recruited to Hellenic Army and two of them died on duty. Goalkeeper Nikolaos Sotiriadis and left defender Georgios Vatikis. They are both among the four Greek footballers who took their last breath on the front. The others were Spyridon Kontoulis of AEK and Mimis Pierrakos of Panathinaikos. Georgios Vatikis, who was the first Greek athlete to fall on the Greek-Italian front, served as a warrant officer. He was 22 years old when he died in Battle of Morava–Ivan. After his death, Vatikis was honorarily promoted to lieutenant and awarded the Silver Cross of Valour and the Homeland of Gratitude. Nikolaos Sotiriadis, who played from 1932 until 1940 for PAOK, died on 28 January 1941 in Kleisura, fighting with the rank of Sergeant for the 5th Infantry Regiment. He was 33 years old.

Macedonia Football Clubs Association Championships (1946–1959) 

After the Second World War, in the early 1950s, PAOK Academy was created by the Austrian coach, Wilhelm (Willi) Sefzik, and was known as the "chicos of Willi". From the newly founded academy sprang some great football players of the period, such as Leandros Symeonidis, Giannelos Margaritis and Giorgos Havanidis.

In 1948, PAOK won the Macedonia Championship for second time in history, and then participated in the final phase of the Panhellenic Championship where they were ranked 3rd. PAOK footballers dedicated the title to the memory of team captain, Thrasyvoulos Panidis, who had lost his life (18 February 1948) in the civil war few days before. Panidis played for PAOK since 1930 and had 122 appearances. In 1950, they emerged once again champions of Macedonia, and the following year (1950–51), the team reached for second time the final of the Greek Cup, but lost 4–0 to Olympiacos at Apostolos Nikolaidis Stadium.

During the summer transfer period of 1953 Kouiroukidis, Petridis, Progios, Geroudis, Kemanidis, Chassiotis and Angelidis joined the team. The acquirement of Lampis Kouiroukidis from Doxa Drama was the most important transfer. Along with Lefteris Papadakis and Christophoros Yientzis, they formed the famous attacking trio of that age.

For four consecutive seasons (1954, 1955, 1956, 1957), PAOK won the Macedonia championship and participated in the Panhellenic Championship, finishing 4th each year. Yientzis was the top scorer in 1953–54 season and Kouiroukidis in 1955–56 season. Coached by Nikos Pangalos, PAOK won the 1954 and 1955 local Macedonia championship unbeaten. In 1955, PAOK participated for third time in a Greek Cup final and were defeated 2–0 by Panathinaikos at Apostolos Nikolaidis Stadium (home ground of Panathinaikos). Ιn 1956, under Hungarian coach Erman Hoffman they won their third consecutive unbeaten local championship. The successful 4-year period ended with 1957 championship, coached by the Austrian Walter Pfeiffer.

Toumba Stadium, first years in Greek National League and rise of Koudas to prominence (1959–1969)

Toumba Stadium 

The Aristotle University of Thessaloniki purchased a two-acre piece of land in the area of Syntrivani Stadium in order to construct new schools. PAOK had to relocate and a 7.5 acres area, owned by the Ministry of National Defence at Toumba district was chosen as the adequate location. The purchase cost was set at 1.5 million drachmas and was paid by PAOK administration in 20 six-month instalments of 75,000 drachmas each. On 7 February 1958, a committee of III Army Corps officers delivered the land to PAOK representatives.

There were still barracks on the premises, housing victims of the Greek Civil War and the 1953 Ionian earthquake. Relocating all these people cost the club 70,000 drachmas. The total cost of the stadium's construction amounted to 6 million drachmas, with just 1.1 million coming from the General Secretariat of Sports as subvention. In spring of 1958 construction work started, based on the plans of architect Minas Trempelas and civil engineer Antonis Triglianos. In an attempt to collect the necessary funds, the club issued the "Lottery for the construction of PAOK New Stadium" in April 1958 at a cost of 20 drachmas each. Since 1956, the administration was withholding 15% of the gate income in order to fund the construction of the new stadium. Many PAOK fans, apart from money, also contributed to construction by volunteering to work as builders. The construction of the stadium was completed at a record time of one year.

The inauguration event was scheduled for Sunday 6 September 1959 with a friendly encounter against AEK (PAOK prevailed 1–0 with a goal by Kostas Kiourtzis). Prime minister Konstantinos Karamanlis's attendance was cancelled at the last minute. However, several ministers of his government were there for the occasion. As for the ball for the first kick-off, it fell at 17:30 off an airplane of Sedes Military Air Base. On inauguration day, 15,000 PAOK supporters packed Toumba Stadium, as that was the stadium's capacity back then. It would increase to 20,000 seats in the following months until it reached a 45,000-seat capacity in the mid-'70s through extensive expansion work.

The attendance record remains at 45,252 tickets and was registered on 19 December 1976 in the goalless draw against AEK. In European football, the highest attendance was a 45,200 crowd in the 1–0 win against Barcelona (UEFA Cup, 16 September 1975).

First years in Greek National League (Alpha Ethniki) 

In 1959 the Alpha Ethniki – the precursor of the current Super League – was set up as a national round-robin tournament and the 1959–60 championship was the first nationwide league competition. In the first decade of Greek Alpha Ethniki (1959–1969), PAOK had a top-half finish in every season except from the 10th-place finish in 1961. The best outcome came out in 1963 and 1967 with a 4th-place finish. Notable players of this period were Leandros Symeonidis, Ioannis Giakoumis, Ignatios Mouratidis, Pavlos Papadopoulos, Anestis Afentoulidis and Giorgos Makris.

Koudas debut and his two-year absence that fueled Olympiacos–PAOK rivalry 

Giorgos Koudas was born on 23 November 1946 in Thessaloniki. At the age of 12, he signed his first contract with PAOK and made his debut with the first team on 21 December 1963 in a 1–0 loss to Ethnikos at Apostolos Nikolaidis Stadium. Koudas' talent immediately started to excel and in 1965–66 season he made 29 apps and scored 13 goals . On 14 July 1966, PAOK fans were shocked by the news of Koudas' descent to Piraeus, accompanied by his father (who was enraged with PAOK administration for financial reasons) and determined to sign for Olympiacos, who tempted him by offering a much higher annual salary without going into a negotiation with his club. PAOK president Giorgos Pantelakis never gave his consent for the transfer to be completed and for the next 2 seasons, Koudas participated only in Olympiacos friendly games. Military junta's Minister of Sports Kostas Aslanidis suggested in 1968 that Koudas should return to PAOK for 2 years and then move to Olympiacos, but Pantelakis turned down his proposition saying  "I may go to Gyaros island (place of exile for leftist political dissidents), but Koudas would never go to Olympiacos". Eventually, Koudas returned to PAOK in the summer of 1968 and led the great team of the 1970s to glorious days. Fueled by this incident, Olympiacos–PAOK rivalry is considered nowadays the fiercest intercity football rivalry in Greece.

1970s and 1980s (1970–1989)

The great team of the 1970s
The 1970s decade was one of the best periods in the history of the football club. Scouting some of the best youth players in Northern Greece at the time and signing many of them to PAOK, president Giorgos Pantelakis built a very strong team (including Stavros Sarafis, Christos Terzanidis, Kostas Iosifidis, Giannis Gounaris, Dimitris Paridis, Achilleas Aslanidis, Koulis Apostolidis, Filotas Pellios, Aristarchos Fountoukidis, Panagiotis Kermanidis, Angelos Anastasiadis, Neto Guerino and captained by Giorgos Koudas). Playing spectacular football, the team managed to win their first Championship (1976), two Cups (1972, 1974), a Greater Greece Cup (1973) and distinguish themselves in European competitions.

PAOK participated in 7 Greek Cup finals from 1970 to 1978 . In 1969–70 Greek Cup PAOK lost 1–0 to local rivals Aris in the final held at Kaftanzoglio Stadium and in the 1970–71 Greek Cup final they were defeated 3–1 by Olympiacos at Karaiskakis Stadium (home ground of Olympiacos).

The first domestic title PAOK won, was the Cup of 1971–72 season. PAOK reached the final for third straight year, sixth in total and it would be the fifth time traveling to Athens for the trophy match. This time PAOK would face league champions Panathinaikos who were also runners-up in 1971 European Cup. The final was held at Karaiskakis Stadium on 5 July 1972. PAOK players had 10,000 fans on their side and they vowed that it was about time to return with the trophy at Thessaloniki. PAOK won the game 2–1 with Koudas scoring both goals. In the second half, a magnificent bicycle kick of Matzourakis found the net, but the goal was surprisingly disallowed by referee Michas. PAOK triumph and 1st Greek Cup title was widely celebrated by the fans at Thessaloniki.

In 1972–73 season, PAOK came close to winning their first ever championship title playing exceptional football under the guidance of Les Shannon. On 25 February 1973 (matchday 20), PAOK who were leading the league table being 3pts (point system 3–2–1) ahead of rivals Olympiacos suffered their first loss with 1–0 in a much disputed derby against Olympiacos at Karaiskakis Stadium. PAOK had tremendous complaints against referee Fakis for not taking the proper disciplinary action against Olympiacos players who committed violent fouls. Two players (Iosifidis and Aslanidis) were substituted in the first half after sustaining injuries. One week later, PAOK lost 1–0 to Fostiras in Athens and Olympiacos drew 0–0 away to Egaleo, results that left the two teams level on pts. On 22 April 1973 (matchday 28), PAOK suffered a 3–5 shock defeat against Panachaiki at Toumba Stadium and Olympiacos who drew 1–1 away to Kavala, took the lead in the standings and went on with 6 wins in the remaining matches to win the championship. At the end of the season, PAOK participated for fourth consecutive year in the Greek Cup final and lost 1–0 to Olympiacos at Karaiskakis Stadium (home ground of Olympiacos).

In 1973–74 season, PAOK reached the quarter-finals of 1973–74 UEFA Cup Winners' Cup where they were knocked out by Milan with 5–2 on aggregate. PAOK defeated Legia Warsaw with 2–1 on aggregate and Lyon with 7–3 on aggregate in the previous rounds. That season, PAOK reached the Greek Cup final for fifth consecutive year. The final was held at Nikos Goumas Stadium, once again in Athens, on Sunday 16 June, and was the first ever that was decided by penalty shoot-out. The game ended in a thrilling 2–2 draw and PAOK won 4–3 on penalties over Olympiacos with Koulis Apostolidis converting the last of the procedure.

1975–76 Greek Champions

In 1975–76 season, with Gyula Lóránt at the helm, the team had two daily practices instead of one and physical condition of the players improved significantly. On 4 January 1976, PAOK made an impressive 4–0 away win over Olympiacos (biggest home defeat of Olympiacos in Greek football history). On 11 April, PAOK defeated Panionios 4–0 and climbed at the top of the standings for first time that season, level on points with AEK who lost 0–1 to Panathinaikos. On matchday 25, AEK were defeated 1–0 by Aris in Thessaloniki and PAOK, with a 3–0 away win over Panachaiki, were alone at the top of the league table. The league title would be decided in two consecutive high-profile encounters at Toumba Stadium. PAOK prevailed 3–1 over Olympiacos and 1–0 over AEK with Neto Guerino scoring the winner in the 89th minute, giving the Double-Headed Eagle of the North a 4pt lead (point system 2–1–0). The league title was clinched on the following matchday, when AEK were held to a goalless draw at Panserraikos and PAOK defeated 3–1 Iraklis at Kaftanzoglio Stadium.

In 1976–77 season, the team tried to defend the title and reached the last 16 of 1976–77 European Cup where they were knocked out by a far superior Dynamo Kyiv side. On 1 May 1977 (matchday 28), PAOK were leading the league table and lost 1–0 to AEK at Nikos Goumas Stadium with a controversial first-half goal that was scored from a direct free kick and while goalkeeper Milinis was still setting up the wall. Referee Tsoukaladelis credited the goal to AEK despite the heavy protests from all PAOK players and he also sent off PAOK midfielder Damanakis in the first half for dangerous play. In the second half, a goal scored by Sarafis with a header was wrongly ruled out for offside. PAOK fell from the top of the table and on 12 June (matchday 32), the team had a great chance against Panathinaikos at a packed Toumba Stadium to regain the lead (Panathinaikos were 1pt ahead). The game ended in a 0–0 stalemate and it was followed by a huge disappointment among the fans not only for the missed chance to win a back-to-back championship, but also for the team performance in the championship decider which did not meet expectations. On 22 June, PAOK lost 2–1 to Panathinaikos in the Greek Cup final held at Karaiskakis Stadium. President Pantelakis was furious with referee Platopoulos who sent off Gounaris in the 64th minute and ordered PAOK players to leave the awarding ceremony without receiving their medals.

In 1977–78 season, PAOK finished runners-up in the league and lost 2–0 to AEK in the Greek Cup final held at Karaiskakis Stadium.

In 1979–80 season, five teams were battling for the championship title. On 9 March 1980 (matchday 24), PAOK were leading the table and lost 0–2 to rivals Panathinaikos at Toumba Stadium. This was the first home defeat after a 62-game unbeaten run (52 wins/10 draws). Kostikos scored two goals in the first half, but both of them were disallowed by referee Litsas. In the second half, Kostikos was brought down in the area by Kovis, but Litsas denied the penalty and sent off PAOK defender Pellios who was protesting. In the final minutes of the game, PAOK had a chance to score from the penalty spot, but the fans shouted to Orfanos to send the ball wide. Orfanos made a really weak side foot-kick which was easily saved by goalkeeper Konstantinou. After the final whistle, all hell broke loose in and around the stadium with 23 police officers and 20 fans sustaining injuries.

On 31 May 1981, PAOK manager Gyula Lóránt had a heart attack in the 16th minute of the match against Olympiacos at Toumba Stadium when Koudas headed the ball wide from close range. Doctors attempted to resuscitate him on the spot, but he died before the ambulance arrived. PAOK players were told in the half-time break that he had to be transported to the hospital and his death was revealed to them only after the game had ended. PAOK eventually won the derby 1–0 with the goal of the substitute Vassilis Vasilakos who was sitting next to Lóránt on the bench when he collapsed. PAOK players wanted to dedicate a Greek Cup title to his memory, but the team lost 3–1 to Olympiacos in the Greek Cup final held at Nikos Goumas Stadium on 21 June.

On 29 June 1983, PAOK participated once again in the Greek Cup final which was held for first time at the newly built Olympic Stadium of Athens. Captained for last time in a Greek Cup final by Koudas, the team lost 2–0 to AEK despite their superiority over the opponents that day. A first-half goal by Kostikos was ruled out for offside.

PAOK also made a memorable appearance against German giants Bayern Munich in the 2nd round of 1983–84 UEFA Cup, where they were knocked out on penalties (9–8) after two goalless draws. Bayern's first penalty kick, taken by Klaus Augenthaler, was saved twice by PAOK goalkeeper Mladen Furtula, but the English referee Arthur Robinson ordered the penalty to be retaken both times. Augenthaler admitted in a 2018 interview that the referee favored Bayern and that he felt uncomfortable when he was asked to take the penalty for a third time.

1984–85 Greek Champions

The second Championship of PAOK came in 1984–85 season, under Austrian manager Walter Skocik. Notable figures of the team included Giorgos Skartados, Nikos Alavantas, Thomas Siggas, Rade Paprica and attacking duo of Giorgos Kostikos and Christos Dimopoulos. It was the last season at the club for Ioannis Damanakis and captain Kostas Iosifidis, who ended his football career.

On 20 January 1985 (matchday 15), PAOK gained a 5pt lead (point system 2–1–0) on the table with a 1–0 away win over Panathinaikos at the Olympic Stadium of Athens. The crucial goal was scored by Paprica in the 80th minute with a diving header. On 9 June, PAOK clinched the league title with a goalless draw at Nea Smyrni Stadium against Panionios, as Panathinaikos were held to a 2–2 draw by bottom of the table Pierikos. It was the only away point of Pierikos that season. On 22 June, 10-man (Vasilakos was sent-off early in the first half) PAOK lost 4–1 to Larissa in the Greek Cup final which was held at the Olympic Stadium of Athens and wasted the opportunity to win a domestic Double for first time in history. An interesting story of the final was that PAOK top goalscorer of that season Christos Dimopoulos did not participate as he left the team at Athens airport when they arrived from Thessaloniki for the game. Dimopoulos headed to the headquarters of Motor Oil (company of Panathinaikos president Vardinogiannis) in order to seal his transfer to Panathinaikos as his 5-year contract with PAOK was expiring.

In 1987–88 season, PAOK were fighting for the title (along with AEL and AEK) up to matchday 23, when they suffered a surprising 0–2 home defeat to Iraklis. Earlier that season, on 6 December 1987, PAOK made a record 6–1 win over rivals Olympiacos at Serres Municipal Stadium (biggest defeat of Olympiacos in Greek Alpha Ethniki/Superleague history). PAOK finished 3rd in the league and qualified for 1988–89 UEFA Cup where they faced Napoli of Maradona, Careca and Alemão. The team fought vigorously, but lost 2–1 on aggregate. Maradona, when asked on RAI TV, moments after the final whistle of the 2nd leg at Toumba Stadium, if he had ever played in such an atmosphere, said "I have played a lot of games, but I have never seen anything like this. We couldn't find any rhythm and I believe that it was difficult for the opponents too. It was a weird encounter".

Voulinos era (1989–1996) 

In 1989–90 season, with Magdy Tolba shining and youngster Giorgos Toursounidis rising, the team managed to reach the half-way stage of the competition topping the table (winter champions), but good form deteriorated and PAOK finished in 3rd place.

1990–91 season started with PAOK facing Sevilla in the 1st round of the UEFA Cup and they were knocked out on penalties (3–4) after two goalless draws. On 23 September 1990 (matchday 2), president Thomas Voulinos stormed the field in the 77th minute of the derby against Panathinaikos at the Olympic Stadium of Athens. Voulinos was furious with referee Karamanis and despite the fact that the scoreline was 3–0 and the winner was already determined, he ordered PAOK players to leave the pitch. After the game which was eventually abandoned, he said "We felt like sheep that were heading to be butchered and that was unacceptable". PAOK were later sentenced with a 3pt deduction and a 5 home games behind closed doors penalty by court decision. The two teams met again in the Greek Cup semi-finals and in the 57th minute of the 2nd leg at Toumba Stadium, Voulinos once again entered the pitch in anger at decisions from referee Vasilakis. Panathinaikos won 2–1 on aggregate.

In 1991–92 season, under Croatian manager Miroslav Blažević, PAOK qualified against the then strong KV Mechelen (winners in 1988, semi-finalists in 1989 Cup Winners' Cup / quarter-finalists in 1990 European Cup) in the 1st round of 1991–92 UEFA Cup with 2–1 on aggregate. Stefanos Borbokis scored the winner in the 85th minute of the 2nd leg at Achter de Kazerne Stadium. Blazevic was replaced by Gounaris later and the team lost in the two-legged Greek Cup final to Olympiacos with 3–1 on aggregate. On 24 May 1992 (matchday 32), PAOK lost 1–2 to Olympiacos at Toumba Stadium and suffered their first home defeat against rivals Olympiacos after a 24-game unbeaten run (21 wins/3 draws – 21 league matches/3 cup matches – goals 52/12) which lasted for 23 years. It is widely rumoured that after this shock defeat, the most renowned PAOK ultras leader Thomas Mavromichalis (nicknamed Makis Manavis, i.e., greengrocer due to his profession – PAOK ultras refer to him as «The General») decided to never set foot again at Toumba Stadium.

On 1 October 1992, PAOK vs Paris Saint-Germain UEFA Cup match was abandoned due to crowd violence and PAOK were punished with a two-year ban from all European competitions by the UEFA disciplinary committee. The sentence was later reduced to one year. In 1994–95 season, under Dutch manager Arie Haan, PAOK finished 3rd in the league and Apollon Athens took their place in the next season's UEFA Cup.

1995–96 season was the worst in club's history. PAOK were seriously threatened with a possible relegation for first time in history. The team managed to avoid relegation few weeks before the end of the league and finished in 14th place.

Batatoudis era (1996–2003) 

In 1996, Thomas Voulinos handed over a debt-free PAOK to Giorgos Batatoudis. Numerous transfers of quality players such as Zisis Vryzas, Spyros Marangos, free kick specialist Kostas Frantzeskos, Percy Olivares and Joe Nagbe took place under the new administration. In May 1997, after a five-year absence from European competitions, PAOK qualified for the UEFA Cup under coach Angelos Anastasiadis. The club's reappearance at European level was marked by a victory and qualification over Arsenal with 2–1 on aggregate. Arsenal went on to win a domestic Double that season. Remembering the 1st leg encounter, captain Tony Adams and goalkeeper David Seaman spoke very highly of the atmosphere created by PAOK fans at Toumba Stadium.

In the night of 9 February 1998, PAOK player Panagiotis Katsouris, aged 21, was returning from an amateur 5x5 match, when his car skidded off the road due to excessive speed, hitting the barriers at the Thermi interchange outside Thessaloniki. His death was verified in AHEPA Hospital shortly afterwards. He was buried on 12 February in the Anastaseos Cemetery in Thessaloniki. A bust was erected in his memory at Toumba Stadium and memorial services are held each year near the accident scene. In February 2009, PAOK announced that a football tournament, bearing his name, would be held annually. Katsouris' No 17 jersey was permanently retired by the club in his memory.

Early in the morning of 4 October 1999, a bus accident took place in the Vale of Tempe, Thessaly, with six PAOK fans killed (Kyriakos Lazaridis, Christina Tziova, Anastasios Themelis, Charalampos Zapounidis, Georgios Ganatsios, Dimitris Andreadakis). The bus was heading back to Thessaloniki after a 1–1 draw against Panathinaikos at the Olympic Stadium of Athens. A ceremony in commemoration of the incident has taken place every year since.

In January 2000, PAOK appointed Dušan Bajević as their new manager. PAOK won the 2001 Greek Cup beating Olympiacos 4–2 in the final held at Nikos Goumas Stadium on 12 May 2001.

On 17 May 2003, PAOK defeated local rivals Aris 1–0 in the final held at Toumba Stadium with an excellent goal scored by Georgiadis and earned their 4th Greek Cup title. PAOK manager Angelos Anastasiadis became the first in club's history to win the Cup both as a player (in 1974) and manager.

During the seven-year period of Batatoudis' ownership, PAOK's debts rose to about €10 million.

Goumenos era, troubled times (2003–2006) 

The 2003–04 season was an unexpected success. Batatoudis was no longer the major shareholder and under coach Anastasiadis, PAOK managed to finish 3rd in the league and to secure participation in the third qualifying round of 2004–05 UEFA Champions League, where they faced Maccabi Tel Aviv. The 1st leg at Toumba Stadium ended 1–2, but it was later awarded 0–3 against PAOK for fielding a suspended player. The club fielded Liasos Louka, a Cypriot player who was still serving a two-match ban in UEFA competitions (for his sending-off in a UEFA Intertoto Cup tie while playing for Nea Salamis on 8 July 2000). Eventually, the team failed to qualify for the group stage.

Rolf Fringer succeeded Angelos Anastasiadis in September 2004, but after a few games, he was replaced by Nikos Karageorgiou, who led the club to a 5th-place finish in May 2005 and a subsequent 2005–06 UEFA Cup qualification.

By the end of May 2006, the club's dramatic situation started to emerge, with players openly declaring they have been unpaid for months, plus a shocking decision by UEFA to ban the club from participating in the upcoming UEFA Cup, brought the club close to dissolution. The organized supporters' groups launched an all-out war against president Giannis Goumenos during the summer of 2006, going as far as to occupy the club's offices in Toumba stadium for a handful of days. The situation was worsening for Goumenos after various negotiations with possible investors failed, constant allegations of embezzlement emerged, and especially after his decision to sell star player Dimitris Salpingidis to Panathinaikos.

On 13 November 2006, Goumenos resigned from PAOK presidency leaving huge debts behind (during the three-year period of Goumenos' ownership, the club's debts rose from about €10 million to around €30 million → €10 million were the primary debt obligations plus €20 million from additional taxes, fines and surcharges) and few weeks later, Nikos Vezyrtzis–Apostolos Oikonomidis duo (former PAOK BC presidents) assumed temporary management of the club.

Zagorakis–Vryzas management with massive fans' support (2007–2012) 

In June 2007, former player and captain Theodoros Zagorakis assumed the presidency of the club, replacing the Nikos Vezyrtzis and Apostolos Oikonomidis administration and thus ushered a new era, in an effort to bring the club back to successes.

In 2007–2008 season, the early replacement of Georgios Paraschos by the well-known established manager Fernando Santos did little to prevent a 9th-place finish in the league. On 6 January 2008, Zisis Vryzas ended his football career coming on as a substitute in the game against AEL and immediately started his tenure as PAOK sports director.

The club's finances gradually improved thanks to new sponsorship deals and to the continuing massive support from the fans (the number of season tickets was vastly increased). In June 2008, Zagorakis announced the club's intention of building a new training facility complex in the Nea Mesimvria area of Thessaloniki, owned by the club. The administration had already acquired land from the municipality of Agios Athanasios and the project would be executed by former president Vasilis Sergiannidis' construction company.

In the summer of 2008, the club brought in promising winger Vieirinha and widely known internationals like Pablo Contreras, Zlatan Muslimović and Pablo García. In the winter transfer window that followed, Olivier Sorlin and Lino joined the team. The end of the 2008–09 season found PAOK in 2nd place, 8pts behind champions Olympiacos. However, team lost in the Super League playoffs (pos. 2–5) to Panathinaikos and finished in 4th place.

In 2009–10 season, PAOK fought for the title up to matchday 26 (Panathinaikos were 2pts ahead), when they lost 2–0 against local rivals Aris at Kleanthis Vikelidis Stadium. The club had tremendous complaints against referee Spathas and after the final whistle, Zagorakis went in the dressing room and apologized to PAOK players for not being able to protect them against poor refereeing. PAOK went on to win the league playoffs (pos. 2–5) and qualified for 2010–11 UEFA Champions League third qualifying round, but the success was swiftly followed by Fernando Santos' announcement of his decision to depart, having concluded his three-year contract as head coach. It was eventually decided in mid-June that Mario Beretta would be his successor.

Beretta was quickly replaced by Pavlos Dermitzakis and became the shortest-serving PAOK coach ever, sitting on the bench for 38 days only. With Dermitzakis at the helm, PAOK faced Ajax and was ultimately eliminated on the away goals rule, managing a 1–1 draw in Amsterdam and a thrilling 3–3 draw in Thessaloniki. Entering the UEFA Europa League playoff round, PAOK were drawn against Fenerbahçe, also eliminated from the Champions League third qualifying round. This time, PAOK fared much better and after winning the home game 1–0 in Thessaloniki, secured a memorable 1–1 draw after extra time in Constantinople. Dermitzakis was removed after a 1–0 loss to Panathinaikos on 17 October. His assistant, Makis Chavos, replaced him as caretaker manager and PAOK reached the knockout phase of the Europa League, losing 2–1 on aggregate to CSKA Moscow. In the league, PAOK finished 3rd and qualified for the 2011–12 UEFA Europa League.

PAOK board appointed Romanian László Bölöni as the club's new head coach for the following season. The team qualified from the UEFA Europa League playoff round and entered the group stage. On 30 November 2011, PAOK achieved a historic 2–1 victory over Tottenham Hotspur at White Hart Lane. With this victory, the club qualified to the knockout phase for second consecutive year. On 26 January 2012, Zagorakis resigned from club's presidency and he was replaced by Vryzas.

Ivan Savvidis era (2012–present) 

On 10 August 2012, Ivan Savvidis acquired PAOK ownership by depositing a fee of €9,951,000 and thus becoming the major shareholder of the club.

In 2012–13 season, under manager Giorgos Donis, PAOK finished 2nd during the regular period, qualifying for the Super League playoffs (pos. 2–5). After a Greek Cup semi-final loss to Asteras Tripoli, Donis was replaced by technical director and former player Georgios Georgiadis, who was appointed as caretaker manager. PAOK managed to win qualification for the third qualifying round of the 2013–14 UEFA Champions League through the playoffs after a last game win against PAS Giannina.

In June 2013, PAOK appointed Huub Stevens as their new coach, but he was dismissed in March 2014 after achieving poor results. Once again, Georgiadis was appointed as caretaker manager and the team managed to reach the 2013–14 Greek Cup final, but lost 4–1 to Panathinaikos at the Olympic Stadium of Athens.

In March 2015, Law N° 4321/2015 on regulations for kickstarting the economy was adopted by the Greek government and stated that a total repayment of a company's primary debt obligations would lead to the deletion of all additional taxes, fines and surcharges. On 12 May 2015, PAOK owner Ivan Savvidis paid the total amount of the club's debts towards Greek public authorities, a fee of  €10,886,811. On 27 May, PAOK hired Frank Arnesen as their new sports director. On 18 June, Igor Tudor was hired as the new manager of the club, signing a three-year contract. On 2 September, PAOK announced the signing of Dimitar Berbatov on a one-year deal. Playing a 3–5–2 formation, the team progressed through three qualifying rounds to reach the UEFA Europa League group stage and on 10 December, PAOK made a surprising 1–0 away win over Borussia Dortmund at Signal Iduna Park. Tudor was replaced in March 2016 by youth-team coach Vladimir Ivić and the team won the Super League playoffs (pos. 2–5) and qualified for the 2016–17 UEFA Champions League third qualifying round.

PAOK won the 2016–17 Greek Cup beating AEK 2–1 in the final held at Panthessaliko Stadium with a controversial goal scored by Pedro Henrique in the 81st minute. Linesman Kalfoglou failed to indicate that the scorer was in an offside position. In the same phase of play, moments before Leovac made the cross to Henrique, Crespo was brought down in the area by Simoes, but PAOK were denied a penalty by referee Kominis. The final was marred by crowd violence before the kick-off. In the Super League playoffs (pos. 2–5) that followed, a game against Panathinaikos at Apostolos Nikolaidis Stadium was abandoned (scoreline 1–0 at the time) when Ivić was struck on his head by a beer can that was thrown from the crowd. The Serbian coach was taken to a public hospital and the match was interrupted by referee Kominis in the 54th minute. Panathinaikos representatives claimed that Ivić exaggerated the impact of the injury and could continue. The game was awarded 0–3 to PAOK by court decision. AEK went on to win the playoffs and PAOK finished 4th. After the end of the season, Ivić did not renew his contract and the club appointed Aleksandar Stanojević whose tenure as PAOK manager did not last long. On 11 August 2017, he was replaced by Răzvan Lucescu.

2017–18 eventful season 

On 25 February 2018 (and while PAOK were leading the league table being 2pts ahead of AEK), PAOK–Olympiacos derby was suspended before kick-off when Olympiacos manager Óscar García Junyent was hit by an object thrown from the crowd (reportedly by an unfolding cash register paper roll). Óscar García received medical attention before being taken to a private general hospital (Interbalkan Medical Center). The private clinic where García was taken issued a statement about five hours after the coach was admitted, saying that due to his medical condition (sensitivity in the jaw, neck pain, dizziness and nausea) García had to stay at the hospital overnight and PAOK vs Olympiacos game never started. Olympiacos communications chief Karapapas stated that he expected a huge apology from PAOK for the incident and that their rivals should become more civilized if they want to develop into a big club. He also claimed that the object that fell onto García was a sealed cash register paper roll, which can be as heavy as a stone and when thrown from a certain height and distance with a certain force can be a very powerful blow. PAOK representatives claimed that the whole incident was a certain tactic from Olympiacos, which eventually did not work out because there was no injury sustained. Medical report of the official doctor of the match, approved by the Greek Football Federation (EPO), stated that García was not seriously injured and could return on the bench, but Olympiacos questioned doctor's credibility because he was a PAOK employee, working in PAOK youth academy. Referee Aretopoulos (who had many controversial moments in his career) submitted two match reports to describe why the game was abandoned (an initial report at Toumba Stadium and a supplementary report few days later that was demanded by first-instance court judge). Olympiacos were later awarded a 0–3 win by court decision.

On 11 March 2018, during a championship decider derby against AEK (timeline of events before the game: 24 Feb: PAOK 52pts/AEK 50pts, 25 Feb: PAOK–Olympiacos suspended before kick-off, 26 Feb: Atromitos–AEK 1–1 and PAOK 52pts/AEK 51pts, 4 Mar: Asteras Tripoli–PAOK 3–2, AEK–Panionios 1–0 and AEK 54pts/PAOK 52pts, 5 Mar: first-instance court sentence: PAOK deducted 3pts, game awarded 0–3 to Olympiacos, 2 home games behind closed doors and AEK 54pts/PAOK 49pts, 10 Mar: court of appeal sentence: 3pts returned to PAOK, game awarded 0–3 to Olympiacos, closed doors penalty suspended and AEK 54pts/PAOK 52pts), the president of the team, Ivan Savvidis, stormed onto the pitch when referee Georgios Kominis disallowed a 90th-minute goal scored by Fernando Varela with a header. The goal was initially credited to PAOK by both the referee who pointed the center spot and the linesman who never raised his flag and ran towards the center. About 10–15 seconds later and while PAOK players were celebrating, linesman Pontikis was approached by AEK players who were protesting and approximately 3 minutes after the goal was scored, they altered their decision. The goal was ruled out for offside (according to referee Kominis, Maurício influenced play). Savvidis entered the pitch with few members of his personal guard and Ľuboš Micheľ (former UEFA Elite referee). At first, he ordered his team to leave the pitch, but his request was denied by PAOK captain Vieirinha. Afterwards they went close to the referee, where Micheľ expressed his complaints about the decision. Leaving the pitch 1 minute after his entry, a tension was built between Savvidis and members of AEK bench and moments later Savvidis took off his jacket and a gun appeared attached to his belt. The referee suspended the game and sent the two teams to the dressing rooms. Savvidis tried to enter into the referees' dressing room, but he was denied entrance by security and few minutes later he left the stadium. Kominis' intention was the game to be continued after 1 hour (and blew his whistle outside the dressing rooms calling the two teams), but AEK general manager Vasilis Dimitriadis approached him and claimed (as can be heard in audio) that the players of AEK were terrified from the incident and could not continue as he felt that their safety was at risk. PAOK vice-president Chrisostomos Gagatsis is heard trying to persuade Dimitriadis to order AEK players to return on the pitch. Soon after, the game was abandoned. The incident caused the league to be suspended by the Greek government. AEK manager Manolo Jiménez giving his side of the story, confirmed that Kominis wanted the game to be concluded, but AEK president told them not to play. He also said about a year later, that AEK players and himself realized that Savvidis was actually carrying a gun on his belt when they received photos on their cellphones and not while they were on the pitch. AEK midfielder Panagiotis Kone in an interview after the game also confirmed that Kominis told them to go out and play for the remaining 5 minutes, but he did not inform AEK players as to whether he would award or overturn PAOK goal when asked in the dressing rooms. He replied that they would be informed outside on the pitch. Of course, both Jiménez and Kone condemned Savvidis' actions and held him responsible for the interruption. PAOK goalkeeper Alexandros Paschalakis stated that it was clearly a legitimate goal scored by Varela, because Maurício was behind the goalkeeper and did not influence play. He also said that Savvidis' invasion of the pitch wasn't proper. On his official match report, referee Kominis wrote down that when the match was interrupted the scoreline was 1–0 and that he decided to award the goal. Kominis received a summons to appear at the court hearing, but he sent a letter instead, explaining that he could not show up due to personal reasons. He also received a legal document with 3 questions from first-instance court judge and gave a definite answer in one of them and a vague response in the other two. Ivan Savvidis apologised for his behaviour two days after the game and he was later banned from all football stadiums for three years. PAOK were sentenced with a 3pt deduction (and 2pts from next season's championship) and AEK were awarded a 0–3 win by court decision. The 6-point swing was a major blow to PAOK's title hopes and the club was unable to secure the title as AEK were crowned champions with three match-days to go.

The club still managed to end their season on a high note by winning their second consecutive Greek Cup beating AEK 2–0 in the final held at the Olympic Stadium of Athens (AEK home ground at the time), with the match refereed after many years in Greece by a foreign referee (David Fernández Borbalán). During the post-game press conference, manager Lucescu and captain Vieirinha (final MVP) both stated that 2018 championship title was stolen from PAOK.

2018–19 unbeaten Champions and first domestic Double 

2018–19 season was the best in club's history. During the 2018–19 Super League Greece, the major derbies, after decades in Greek football history, were refereed by foreign referees.

On 21 April, PAOK beat Levadiakos 5–0 and clinched the league title, hosting a memorable celebration. On 5 May, PAOK earned their 26th win in 30 games to complete an undefeated season (26–4–0 record). This is arguably the best performance in Greek football history, the previous held by Panathinaikos, who won the 1963–64 Alpha Ethniki title undefeated, but with a 24–6–0 record. PAOK were also the only unbeaten European football club in the national championships held across Europe during the 2018–2019 season.

On 11 May, PAOK won the Greek Cup for third consecutive year, defeating AEK 1–0. This was the third consecutive Greek Cup final against the same opponent and it was held for second consecutive year at the Olympic Stadium of Athens (AEK home ground at the time). The Video assistant referee (VAR) was used for the first time in Greek football and in a Greek Cup final. The winning goal came in the 45th minute with an overhead kick of Chuba Akpom. Dimitris Pelkas provided the assist. With this Greek Cup victory, PAOK FC achieved a domestic Double for first time in their history.

Vieirinha was named MVP of the Season.

2020–21 Greek Cup Winners and 2021–22 UEFA Europa Conference League quarter-finalists
On 22 May 2021, under Uruguayan manager and fan favorite Pablo García, PAOK won their eighth Greek Cup title, beating Olympiacos 2–1 in the final held at the Athens Olympic Stadium with Michael Krmenčík scoring the winner in the 90th minute. In 2021–22 season, PAOK reached the quarter-finals of the inaugural UEFA Europa Conference League, losing 1–3 on aggregate to Marseille. On 21 May 2022, PAOK lost 1–0 to Panathinaikos in the Greek Cup final which was held at the Olympic Stadium of Athens.

Crest and colours

Crest 
The first emblem of PAOK depicted a four-leaf clover and a horseshoe. The leaves were green and above them were the initials of the word PAOK. Kostas Koemtzopoulos, one of PAOK's founding members, came up with this idea, inspired by his favourite brand of cigarettes.

On 20 March 1929, AEK Thessaloniki was dissolved and absorbed by PAOK and a mournful version of the double-headed eagle with the wings closed instead of stretched, indicating the grief for the lost homelands, was adopted as the club's new emblem.

On 11 June 2013, under the presidency of Ivan Savvidis, a golden outline was added to the crest, as a symbol of the club's Byzantine heritage.

During the 2018–19 season, the first emblem was used on the third kit.

Colours 

The club's colours have always been black and white, black for the sorrow related to countless thousands of Greek refugees who were forced to leave the land their ancestors had been living in for centuries (Asia Minor, Eastern Thrace, Pontus, Caucasus) and white for the hope of a new beginning that came with settling in a new home. PAOK's traditional kit features a black and white vertical striped shirt, combined with black or white shorts and socks. Various types of shirts were used throughout the club's history and the most common alternatives were those with thinner or wider stripes, the all-black one and the all-white one. Over the years, several other colours were used on the 3rd kit, such as grey, silver, blue, purple, orange and red.

Kit suppliers and shirt sponsors 
The current kit manufacturer is Macron, a collaboration that started in July 2015 and was extended until 2023. Stoiximan, a Greek online gambling company, is the shirt sponsor since June 2017, with the sponsorship deal extended twice and set to last until 2025.

Facilities

Stadium

Syntrivani Stadium was PAOK's first home ground. It was situated near the Children's Asylum, where the Theological School of Aristotle University stands today.

Their current home ground is Toumba Stadium, which was built in 1959. The stadium has been renovated many times since and its seating capacity is 29,000.

New Stadium project

PAOK administration have already presented to the Greek public authorities an architecture study of a new Stadium at Toumba. The Greek Council of State (CoS), the country's supreme court, in April 2022 approved a proposal to setup the complete redevelopment of Toumba Stadium, with the CoS deeming legal a draft Presidential Decree concerning the approval of a Special Urban Plan for the district of Toumba, where the venue is located. On 21 June 2022, PAOK has formalized the beginning of a collaboration with a team consisting of domestic engineering and consulting firm SALFO and global architectural design company Populous to deliver the project's master plan. It is estimated that PAOK will be granted a building permit in 2023 and construction process should last three to four years. PAOK would probably move to Kaftanzoglio Stadium until the new Stadium is built.

Training Facilities and Academy

PAOK FC Sport Center is the training ground of the first team and Academy, located in Nea Mesimvria area of Thessaloniki. The construction started under the presidency of Theodoros Zagorakis.

Supporters 

PAOK FC is the most widely supported football club in Northern Greece and with the 3rd largest fanbase in the country, according to the latest polls and researches.

PAOK's traditional fanbase comes from the city of Thessaloniki, where the club is based, as well as from the rest of Macedonia region and Northern Greece. They also have fans all over the country and in the Greek Diaspora (Germany, Australia, USA, etc.). Research by Marca in August 2018 reported that PAOK are the most popular Greek football team on social media.

Toumba Stadium is infamous for its hostile atmosphere, a factor that led to the attribution of the Stadium as "The Black Hell". On high-profile encounters, when the players walk out of the tunnel, the song Hells Bells by AC/DC is heard from the stadium's speakers. The notorious Gate 4 is home to many PAOK organized supporters' groups from around the globe, with the homonymous Gate 4 fan club which was founded in April 1976, being the most familiar everywhere. The supporters' group from Neapoli district of Thessaloniki that was founded in 1963 is the oldest one. One of the biggest banners in the world was created by Michaniona fan club.

No 12 jersey is dedicated to the fans, the symbolic 12th man on the pitch. It was permanently retired by the club on 16 August 2000.

Vale of Tempe tragedy (4/10/1999) 

Constantly on tour in order to follow their beloved team everywhere, some 3,000 PAOK fans descended to the Olympic Stadium of Athens for the game against Panathinaikos on 3 October 1999. A few hours later, time stopped. On its way back to Thessaloniki, the double-decker bus of the Kordelio fan club collided with a truck and fell into a ditch in the Vale of Tempe, Thessaly. The aftermath of the bus crash was devastating. Six PAOK fans lost their lives (Kyriakos Lazaridis, Christina Tziova, Anastasios Themelis, Charalampos Zapounidis, Georgios Ganatsios, Dimitris Andreadakis) and many others were injured. A roadside memorial was erected at the site of the crash bearing the following inscription: "Their love for PAOK brought them here, left them here and went beyond".

Friendships 

 Partizan
 CSKA Moscow
 OFI

PAOK fans maintain a strong friendship with the supporters of Serbian club Partizan, the Grobari. On many occasions, fans from both clubs traveled to watch each other's games. Lately, some PAOK supporters' groups have developed a friendship with fans of CSKA Moscow (common Orthodox faith).

PAOK fans have good relations with the fans of OFI Crete, a friendship that started in October 1987 when OFI faced Atalanta for 1987–88 Cup Winners' Cup at Toumba Stadium and numerous PAOK fans supported the Cretans.

Rivalries 

Olympiacos
Aris
Panathinaikos
AEK

The rivalry between Olympiacos and PAOK is the fiercest intercity football rivalry in Greece and is long-standing, emerging in the 1960s, when Olympiacos unsuccessfully tried to acquire Giorgos Koudas from PAOK, approaching him directly without going into a negotiation with his club.

A longtime heated rivalry exists between PAOK and local rivals Aris.

Panathinaikos and AEK, Athens' two big clubs, are also considered major rivals.

There are also some less intense rivalries, like those with Iraklis (local conflict) and AEL can be characterized as.

Honours

Domestic

Super League
Winners (3): 1975–76, 1984–85, 2018–19
Greek Cup
Winners (8): 1971–72, 1973–74, 2000–01, 2002–03, 2016–17, 2017–18, 2018–19, 2020–21
Greater Greece Cup
Winners (1): 1973
Double
Winners (1): 2018–19

European
 UEFA Cup Winners' Cup:
 Quarter-finalists (1): 1973–74
 UEFA Europa Conference League
 Quarter-finalists (1): 2021–22

Regional
Macedonia FCA Championship:
Winners (7): 1936–37, 1947–48, 1949–50, 1953–54, 1954–55, 1955–56, 1956–57
Macedonia–Thrace FCA Championship:
Winners (1): 1939–40

European record 

Last updated: 28 July 2022

UEFA Club Ranking

Current ranking 
{| class="wikitable" style="text-align: center;"
|-
! Rank !! Team !! Coeff.
|-
|52||align=left| Olympique Marseille|| 29.000
|-
|53||align=left| Celtic|| 29.000
|-
|54||align=left| Gent|| 29.000
|-
|55||align=left| PAOK|| 25.000|-
|56||align=left| Malmo  FF|| 25.000
|-
|57||align=left| FK Krasnodar|| 25.000
|-
|58||align=left| Real Betis|| 24.000
|}

Players

First-team squad

 Reserves and Academy 

Other players under contract

 Out on loan 

}

 Captains (since 1959) 

Notes

MVP of the Season

Source: 

Notes

 Coaching Staff 

Source: PAOK F.C.

 Notable Managers 

The following managers won at least one national trophy when in charge of PAOK:

Gallery

 Management 

 Board of Directors 

 PAOK FC presidents 

 Records and statistics 

 One-club men 

 Player records 

Giorgos Koudas holds the record for most PAOK league appearances, having played 504 matches (607 overall) from 1963 to 1984.

Stavros Sarafis is the club's top goalscorer with 170 goals overall (136 in league matches), from 1967 to 1981.

 Domestic records 

 See also 

P.A.O.K.
PAOK B
Greek refugees
PAOK F.C. in European football
List of PAOK FC records and statistics
List of PAOK FC seasons
Thessaloniki
Toumba (Thessaloniki)
Toumba Stadium
PAOK FC Sport Center
PAOK Academy

 Bibliography 
 Kanotas, Miltiadis (2005). 80 χρόνια, αυτός είναι ο ΠΑΟΚ . Ελλάδα: Εκδόσεις Εκδοτική Θεσσαλονίκης.
 Κυρίτσης, Δημήτρης ; Στεφανίδης, Ανέστης ; Τσιομπανούδη, Ελένη (2005). ΠΑΟΚ, Πανθεσσαλονίκειος Αθλητικός Όμιλος Κωνσταντινοπουλιτών 1926-2005 . Ελλάδα: Εκδόσεις Κέντρο Ιστορίας Θεσσαλονίκης. .
 Μπλιάτκας, Κώστας (2005). Γιώργος Κούδας, της ζωής μου το παιχνίδι . Ελλάδα: Εκδόσεις Ιανός. .
 Συλλογικό έργο (2009). Για πάντα πρωταθλητές, Π.Α.Ο.Κ. Ποδόσφαιρο-Μπάσκετ . Ελλάδα: Εκδόσεις Σκάι. .
 Τσάλλος, Αλέξιος (2010). Το αλφαβητάρι του ΠΑΟΚ . Ελλάδα: Εκδόσεις Δίαυλος. .
 Τσιώλης, Σταύρος (2011). Ταξιδεύοντας με τον ΠΑΟΚ . Ελλάδα: Εκδόσεις Αιγόκερως. .
 Πετρακόπουλος, Σταύρος (2016). Τα «μυθικά» του ΠΑΟΚ . Ελλάδα: Εκδόσεις Friends Press. .
 Ζαμπούνης, Χρήστος (2016). ΠΑΟΚ αφού . Ελλάδα: Εκδόσεις Φερενίκη. .
 Ιωαννίδης, Νίκος (2017). Μια εποχή στο τσιμέντο . Ελλάδα: Εκδόσεις Τόπος. .
 Εδίρνελης, Σωκράτης (2018). Το κλεμμένο πρωτάθλημα . Ελλάδα: Εκδόσεις ΑΛΔΕ. .
 Παππούς, Μιχάλης (2019). Ο ΠΑΟΚ του 70 . Ελλάδα: Εκδόσεις University Studio Press. .

 Filmography 
 Νίκος Τριανταφυλλίδης. 90 χρόνια ΠΑΟΚ - Νοσταλγώντας το μέλλον, 2016.

 References 

 External links Official websites Official website 
 PAOK at Super League 
 PAOK at UEFANews sites PAOK on paok24.com 
 PAOK news from Nova SportsMedia'''
 Official YouTube channel

 
Association football clubs established in 1926
1926 establishments in Greece
Football clubs in Thessaloniki
Unrelegated association football clubs